The Miss Nevada USA competition is the pageant that selects the representative for the state of Nevada in the Miss USA pageant.

While Nevada did well in the early years of the Miss USA pageant, they only placed once from 1987 to 2000.  This streak was broken by Gina Giacinto's finalist placing in Miss USA 2001. Many Miss Nevada USA titleholders previously competed in the Miss Teen USA and Miss America pageants.  Seven titleholders previously held the Miss Teen USA state titles six of which having won Miss Nevada Teen USA and the other was Miss Washington Teen USA, three held the Miss Nevada Crown in the Miss America Pageant.

Nia Sanchez of Las Vegas became the first Miss USA ever from the state of Nevada when she was crowned Miss USA 2014, she later placed first runner-up in Miss Universe 2014 to Paulina Vega of Colombia.

Summer Keffeler of Paradise was crowned Miss Nevada USA 2022 on May 15, 2022 at South Point Hotel, Casino & Spa in Las Vegas. She represented Nevada for the title of Miss USA 2022.

Gallery of titleholders

Results summary

Placements
Miss USA: Nia Sanchez (2014)
1st runners-up: Mary O'Neal Contino (1977)
2nd runners-up: Joan Adams (1957), Karen Weller (1961), Kathy Landry (1968), Sheri Schruhl (1970), Carolina Urrea (2018)
3rd runners-up: Jade Kelsall (2012), Brittany McGowan (2015)
4th runners-up: Janet Hadland (1962), Helen Salas (2007)
Top 5: Gia Giacinto (2001), Tianna Tuamoheloa (2019)
Top 10/11/12: Linda Dryden (1974), Christa Lane Daniel (1983), Tammy Perkins (1987), Chelsea Caswell (2013)
Top 15/16/19: Earlene Whitt (1953), Joy Blaine (1959), Kathee Francis (1963), Denyse Turner (1965), Jacqueline Moore (1967), Karen Essklinger (1969), Lauren Scyphers (2006), Victoria Olona (2020)

Nevada holds a record of 25 placements at Miss USA.

Awards
Miss Congeniality: Alesia Prentiss (1992) 
Best State Costume: Lagracella Omran (1988)

Winners 

Color key

1 Age at the time of the Miss USA pageant

See also

References

External links
 Official Website

Nevada
Nevada culture
Recurring events established in 1952
Women in Nevada
Annual events in Nevada
1952 establishments in Nevada